Oleksandr Yevhenovych Kucherenko (born 1 October 1991) is a professional footballer who plays as a defensive midfielder for Ukrainian Premier League club Inhulets Petrove. Born in Ukraine, he has represented Moldova at youth level.

Career
Kucherenko is the product of his native Slavkhlib Slovyansk. He played for Avanhard Kramatorsk, appearing in Ukrainian Second League matches. During the 2011–2012 transfer winter window he moved to play in Moldova until the end of 2014.

Controversy 
In 2012 Kucherenko was signed for FC Nistru Otaci, claiming that he was a citizen of Moldova born in 1994. The next year, he was called up to play for the Moldova under-19 team, making one appearance. Previously, however, he had presented himself as a Ukrainian citizen born in 1991. For these reasons, in the end of 2014 by the Football Federation of Moldova launched an investigation, but the findings were inconclusive.

References

External links
 
 
 

1991 births
Living people
People from Sloviansk
Ukrainian footballers
Moldovan footballers
Moldova youth international footballers
Association football midfielders
FC Slavkhlib Slovyansk players
FC Kramatorsk players
FC Nistru Otaci players
FC Costuleni players
FC Veris Chișinău players
FC Zirka Kropyvnytskyi players
FC Inhulets Petrove players
FC Volyn Lutsk players
Moldovan Super Liga players
Ukrainian Premier League players
Ukrainian First League players
Ukrainian Second League players
Ukrainian Amateur Football Championship players
Sportspeople from Donetsk Oblast